Richard Cherry Crayne (April 24, 1913 – August 14, 1985) was an American football fullback for the Brooklyn Dodgers of the National Football League (NFL).  He was drafted in the first round with the fourth overall pick in the 1936 NFL Draft. He played in 1936, rushing for 203 yards, and completed 1 of 2 passes for 52 yards. Then in 1937, rushing for 135 yards, and completed 2 of 4 passes for 20 yards. In 1935, he was selected as a third-team All-American by both the United Press and the Associated Press while playing for the University of Iowa. Crayne served as the head football coach at Westmar University in Le Mars, Iowa from 1939 to 1951. He died on August 14, 1985, at a hospital in Sioux City, Iowa.

NFL Career Statistics

Head coaching record

References

External links
 
 

1913 births
1985 deaths
American football fullbacks
Brooklyn Dodgers (NFL) players
Iowa Hawkeyes football players
Kansas Jayhawks football coaches
Westmar Eagles football coaches
People from Fairfield, Iowa
People from Washington County, Iowa
Players of American football from Iowa